The 12645 / 46 Ernakulam Hazrat Nizamuddin Millennium Express is a Superfast Express train belonging to Indian Railways - Southern Railway zone that runs between Ernakulam Junction and Hazrat Nizamuddin in India.

It operates as train number 12645 from Ernakulam Junction to Hazrat Nizamuddin and as train number 12646 in the reverse direction serving the 8 states of Kerala, Tamil Nadu, Andhra Pradesh, Telangana, Maharashtra, Madhya Pradesh, Uttar Pradesh and Delhi.

Coaches

The 12645 / 46 Ernakulam Hazrat Nizamuddin Millennium Express has 1 AC 2 tier, 2 AC 3 tier, 11 Sleeper Class, 3 General Unreserved & 2 SLR (Seating cum Luggage Rake) Coaches. It does not carry a Pantry car coach but carries a green bogie for movement of fruits and vegetables.

As is customary with most train services in India, Coach Composition may be amended at the discretion of Indian Railways depending on demand.

Service

As the average speed of the train is above , as per Indian Railways rules, its fare includes a Superfast surcharge.

Routeing

The 12645 / 46 Ernakulam Hazrat Nizamuddin Millennium Express runs from Ernakulam Junction via Coimbatore Junction, Erode Junction, Katpadi Junction, Renigunta Junction, Gudur, Vijayawada Junction, Warangal, Balharshah, Nagpur, Itarsi Junction, Bhopal Junction, Jhansi Junction, Agra Cantonment, Mathura Junction to Hazrat Nizamuddin.

Traction

As route is fully electrified, an Erode or Royapuram based WAP-4 locomotive hauls the train for its entire journey.

Operation

12645 Ernakulam Hazrat Nizamuddin Millennium Express runs from Ernakulam Junction every Saturday reaching Hazrat Nizamuddin on the 3rd day.

12646 Hazrat Nizamuddin Ernakulam Millennium Express runs from Hazrat Nizamuddin every Tuesday reaching Ernakulam Junction on the 3rd day .

prospects

References 

 http://www.holidayiq.com/railways/millennium-express-12645-train.html
 https://www.youtube.com/watch?v=EIYCBUy50sg
 http://www.newindianexpress.com/states/tamil_nadu/article1459980.ece

External links

Named passenger trains of India
Rail transport in Kerala
Rail transport in Tamil Nadu
Rail transport in Andhra Pradesh
Rail transport in Telangana
Rail transport in Maharashtra
Rail transport in Madhya Pradesh
Rail transport in Uttar Pradesh
Rail transport in Delhi
Express trains in India